Sânger is a commune in Mureș County, Transylvania, Romania that is composed of seven villages:

 Until 1996 Chimitelnic.

Sânger lies on the Transylvanian Plateau.

In 2002, the commune had a population of 2,530, of which 87% were Romanians, 7% Hungarians, and 6% Roma.

Natives
Gheorghe Cipăianu
Teofil Oroian
Vasile Pop

References

Communes in Mureș County
Localities in Transylvania